Josué Isaias Villafranca Quiñónez (born 16 December 1999) is a Honduran footballer currently playing as a forward for CF Intercity on loan from F.C. Motagua.

Career statistics

Club

Notes

References

Living people
1999 births
Honduran footballers
Honduras youth international footballers
Association football forwards
Liga Nacional de Fútbol Profesional de Honduras players
F.C. Motagua players
C.D. Real de Minas players
C.D.S. Vida players
Tercera División players
Honduran expatriate footballers
Expatriate footballers in Spain
Honduran expatriate sportspeople in Spain
Honduras under-20 international footballers
People from El Paraíso Department
CF Intercity players